The Bourne Ultimatum is a 2007 action-thriller film directed by Paul Greengrass loosely based on the 1990 novel of the same name by Robert Ludlum.  The screenplay was written by Tony Gilroy, Scott Z. Burns and George Nolfi and based on a screen story of the novel by Gilroy. The Bourne Ultimatum is the third installment in the Jason Bourne film series, after The Bourne Identity (2002) and The Bourne Supremacy (2004). The fourth film, The Bourne Legacy, was released in August 2012, without the involvement of Damon, and the fifth film (a direct sequel to Ultimatum), Jason Bourne, was released in July 2016.

Matt Damon reprises his role as Ludlum's signature character, former CIA assassin and psychogenic amnesiac Jason Bourne. In the film, Bourne continues his search for information about his past before he was part of Operation Treadstone and becomes a target of a similar assassin program.

The Bourne Ultimatum was produced by Universal Pictures and was released on August 3, 2007, and grossed a total of $444.1 million worldwide becoming, at the time, Damon's highest-grossing film with him as the lead. The film received universal acclaim from critics, who considered it to be the best film in the series. It was chosen by National Board of Review as one of the top ten films of 2007 and went on to win all three of its nominations at the 80th Academy Awards: Best Film Editing, Best Sound Mixing and Best Sound Editing.

Plot
Following his pursuit by Kirill, Jason Bourne evades Moscow police while wounded and deals with more flashbacks of when he first joined Operation Treadstone.

Six weeks later, CIA Deputy Director Pamela Landy reveals the audiotaped confession of Ward Abbott, the late former head of Treadstone, to Director Ezra Kramer. Meanwhile, in Turin, journalist Simon Ross of The Guardian learns about Bourne and Operation Blackbriar, the program succeeding Treadstone. Using the ECHELON system, the CIA detects Ross when he mentions Blackbriar during a phone call to his editor. Bourne reappears in Paris to inform Martin Kreutz, the brother of his girlfriend Marie, of her assassination in India.

Bourne reads Ross's articles and arranges a meeting with him at London Waterloo station. Bourne realizes that the CIA is following Ross and helps him evade capture for a while. However, after panicking, Ross ignores Bourne's instructions, and is shot to death by Blackbriar assassin Paz on orders of Deputy Director Noah Vosen. Vosen's team, reluctantly assisted by Landy, analyzes Ross's notes and identifies his source as Neal Daniels, a CIA station chief. Bourne makes his way to Daniels' office in Madrid but finds it empty. Nicky Parsons, a former Treadstone operative who shares a history with Bourne, tells him that Daniels has fled to Tangier and aids his escape from an arriving CIA unit.

Meanwhile, Blackbriar "asset" Desh Bouksani is tasked with killing Daniels. Noticing that Nicky accessed information about Daniels, Vosen sends Bouksani after her and Bourne, a decision with which Landy fiercely disagrees. Bourne follows Bouksani to Daniels but fails to prevent Daniels's assassination. However, Bourne manages to kill Bouksani and save Nicky. Bourne then sends her into hiding. Examining the contents of Daniels' briefcase, Bourne finds the address of the deep-cover CIA bureau in New York City, where Vosen directs Blackbriar. Bourne travels to New York.

Landy receives a phone call from Bourne, which is intercepted by Vosen. Landy tells him that his real name is David Webb and gives him the birth date "4-15-71". Vosen also intercepts a text to Landy from Bourne of a location to meet up, and leaves his office with a tactical team. Bourne, however, waits for them all to leave, enters Vosen's office, and takes classified Blackbriar documents. Realizing what is going on, Vosen sends Paz after Bourne. The resulting chase ends with Bourne and Paz crashing their cars. Bourne holds the injured Paz at gunpoint, but spares his life.

Bourne arrives at a hospital at 415 East 71st Street, having figured out Landy's coded message. He gives Landy the Blackbriar files before going inside. On an upper floor, Bourne confronts Dr. Albert Hirsch, the man who ran Treadstone's behavior modification program. Bourne now remembers that he was forced to volunteer for Treadstone. While fleeing to the roof, he is confronted by Paz, who asks, "Why didn't you take the shot?"  Bourne asks Paz if he knows why he is supposed to kill him, and repeats the  dying words of the professor: "Look at us. Look at what they make you give." Vosen appears and shoots at Bourne, who jumps into the East River.

Three days later, Nicky watches a news broadcast about the exposure of Operation Blackbriar, the arrests of Hirsch and Vosen, a criminal investigation against Kramer, and the status of David Webb, a.k.a. Jason Bourne. Upon hearing that his body has not been found, Nicky smiles. Bourne turns out to have survived the fall.

Cast

 Matt Damon as Jason Bourne, a former operative for the black ops Operation Treadstone.
 Julia Stiles as Nicolette "Nicky" Parsons, Bourne's former Treadstone contact in Paris. 
 David Strathairn as Noah Vosen, CIA deputy director in charge of the new Treadstone black ops upgrade called Operation Blackbriar.
 Scott Glenn as Ezra Kramer, director of the CIA.
 Paddy Considine as Simon Ross, a reporter for The Guardian who has been investigating Treadstone.
 Édgar Ramírez as Paz, a Blackbriar assassin.
 Albert Finney as Dr. Albert Hirsch, the psychologist who oversaw Treadstone's behavioral modification program.
 Joan Allen as Pamela Landy, CIA deputy director and task force chief, sent in to aid Vosen in tracking down Bourne.
 Daniel Brühl as Martin Kreutz, Marie's brother
Tom Gallop reprises his role as special agent Tom Cronin, Pamela Landy's assistant. Corey Johnson plays Ray Wills, Vosen's deputy at Operation Blackbriar. Joey Ansah plays Desh Bouksani, a Blackbriar asset tasked to kill Bourne in Tangier. Colin Stinton plays Neal Daniels, CIA station chief in Madrid and a former member of Treadstone, who observed David Webb's initiation into the project and his transition to Jason Bourne. Lucy Liemann plays Lucy, a Blackbriar technician. Franka Potente has an appearance in a flashback as Marie Kreutz, Bourne's murdered girlfriend.

Production

The Bourne Ultimatum was filmed at Pinewood Studios near London and in multiple locations around the world, including Tangier, London, Paris, Madrid (as itself and double for Turin), Berlin (as double for Moscow), New York City including the Springs Mills Building (as the deep cover CIA offices), and other locations in the U.S.

Tony Gilroy, who had co-written the screenplays of the first two Bourne films, had intended The Bourne Supremacy to emphasise Bourne's repentance and atonement for his murders, but felt that the released film omitted this focus. Gilroy was persuaded to write an initial draft of The Bourne Ultimatum, but did not participate further, and as of 2009 had not watched the finished film.  Gilroy's screenplay draft was subsequently criticized by Matt Damon.

Tom Stoppard wrote a draft of the screenplay, later saying "I don't think there's a single word of mine in the film." Greengrass said the film included several allusions to scenes from previous Bourne films; for example, the opening chase sequence of The Bourne Ultimatum is a continuation of the Russian police attempts to capture Bourne in Moscow near the end of The Bourne Supremacy and takes place soon after Bourne's apology to Neski's daughter.

Paul Greengrass spoke about the characterization of Jason Bourne in The Bourne Ultimatum shortly before its release:

Music

As with the previous films in the trilogy, the score was composed by John Powell. A new version of Moby's "Extreme Ways", entitled "Extreme Ways (Bourne's Ultimatum)", was recorded for the film's end credits.

"Scotty Doesn't Know", which Bourne listens to while sniping, is a song which Damon's character sings in EuroTrip.

Release
A premiere of The Bourne Ultimatum was held in downtown Oklahoma City on July 31, 2007, at Harkins Bricktown Theaters to benefit The Children's Center, located in suburban Bethany. The film was shown simultaneously on three screens. Matt Damon was at the event to greet guests. The film premiered at Leicester Square in London on August 15, 2007, with Matt Damon, Julia Stiles and Joan Allen attending. The film was released the next day. The film premiered in Sydney on August 8, 2007, at the State Theatre, with Matt Damon attending. An advance screening of The Bourne Ultimatum was held at The Egyptian Theatre to benefit Boise Contemporary Theater on July 30, 2007. Producer Frank Marshall and actor Matt Damon were in attendance. The first two films, The Bourne Identity and The Bourne Supremacy, also had advance charity screenings in Boise. The Bourne Ultimatum was released nationwide on August 30, 2007.

Home media
The film was released on both DVD and HD DVD on December 11, 2007 in North America. The DVD was released in both Fullscreen and 2.35:1 Widescreen aspect ratios. The HD DVD and DVD special features include several deleted scenes, featurettes, audio commentary, and exclusively on the HD DVD version, HDi Interactive Format features such as Picture-in-Picture Video Commentary. In addition to the stand-alone DVD release, there is a limited edition 'The Jason Bourne Collection' gift set, featuring all three films on DVD and a bonus disc with myriad bonus features such as deleted scenes and featurettes. The gift set features Swiss Bank safe deposit box packaging including foreign currency and a Jason Bourne passport. The film and special features on the HD DVD version are presented in 2:35:1 Widescreen high definition 1080i and offer Dolby TrueHD 5.1 lossless and Dolby Digital Plus 5.1 audio options.

Reception

Box office
The Bourne Ultimatum earned $69,283,690 during its opening weekend at the box office, which at the time had the highest August opening weekend, beating Rush Hour 2. It would hold that record for seven years until it was overtaken by Guardians of the Galaxy in 2014. At the end of its theatrical release, the film grossed a total of $227,471,070 in the U.S. and $215,353,068 in foreign markets for a worldwide total of $442,824,138, making it the highest-grossing film in the series.

Critical response
On Rotten Tomatoes, the film had an overall approval rating of 92% based on 265 reviews and an average score of 8/10. The website's critics consensus reads, "The Bourne Ultimatum is an intelligent, finely tuned non-stop thrill ride. Another strong performance from Matt Damon and sharp camerawork from Paul Greengrass make this the finest installment of the Bourne trilogy." On Metacritic, the film received a weighted average score of 85 out of 100 based on 38 critics, indicating "universal acclaim". Audiences surveyed by CinemaScore gave the film a grade "A" on scale of A+ to F. All segments of the audience gave it a grade "A" or better. The audience was 56% male, and 82% was 25 or older.

Like its predecessor, The Bourne Supremacy, the film was criticized for its use of "shaky camera" work, as Richard Corliss of Time magazine, in an otherwise positive review, wondered "why, in the chat scenes, the camera is afflicted with Parkinson's? The film frame trembles, obscures the speaker with the listener's shoulder, annoys viewers and distracts them from the content of the scene."

In the British press, the inclusion of a fictional journalist from the real British paper The Guardian and scenes set in the United Kingdom (particularly Waterloo railway station) were commented upon. In particular, that newspaper's reviewer joked that "dodging bullets from a CIA sniper... is the sort of thing which happens to us Guardian journalists all the time."

The film was also well received in the hacker subculture, as it showed actual real-world applications such as the Bourne-again shell and Nmap, unlike many other films featuring hacking scenes (such as Hackers).

Top ten lists
The film appeared on several critics' top ten lists of the best films of 2007.
 1st — Empire
 1st — Best Action/Adventure, Rotten Tomatoes
 2nd — Claudia Puig, USA Today
 2nd — Steven Rea, The Philadelphia Inquirer
 2nd — Joshua Rothkopf, Time Out New York
 9th — Rene Rodriguez, The Miami Herald
 10th — Christy Lemire, Associated Press

Accolades

Other awards
 ITV3 Crime Thriller Award for Film of the Year, 2008
 Screen Actors Guild Award for Outstanding Performance by a Stunt Ensemble in a Motion Picture, 2007

Sequels

In May 2007, prior to the release of The Bourne Ultimatum, Matt Damon claimed that he would not be interested in returning for a fourth Bourne film, stating (of his participation in the Bourne franchise): "We have ridden that horse as far as we can."  Damon said in August 2007:

However, on February 22, 2008, Variety reported that a fourth film was indeed in the works, with both Damon and Greengrass on board.

On October 16, 2008, it was announced that George Nolfi would write the script, with Frank Marshall producing, and Jeffrey Weiner and Henry Morrison executive producing. Matt Damon, Julia Stiles, Joan Allen, and Paul Greengrass were also attached to the film. Joshua Zetumer had been hired to write a parallel script—a draft which could be combined with another (Nolfi's, in this instance)—by August 2009 since Nolfi would be directing The Adjustment Bureau that September.

On February 1, 2010, Damon, speaking at the U.K. premiere of Invictus, revealed that a follow-up to The Bourne Ultimatum was "at least five years away". Greengrass, also at the premiere, re-stated that he would not be part of any further Bourne films "unless the right script came along". However, Damon revealed that in the meantime there may be a Bourne "prequel of some kind, with another actor and another director". Matt Damon reconfirmed this on a March 10, 2010 appearance of Today and that he would only be involved if Greengrass was directing.

In June 2010, it was announced that Tony Gilroy would be writing The Bourne Legacy and it would have a 2012 release date.  That October, Gilroy was announced as the director of The Bourne Legacy; he confirmed that Damon would not return for this film and that there would be "a whole new hero":

The Bourne Legacy was released in the U.S. on August 10, 2012.

Universal Pictures stated at a media conference in Los Angeles, California, that they are likely to release more Bourne films, despite The Bourne Legacy being given mixed reviews by critics. On September 15, 2014, it was announced that Damon and Greengrass will indeed return for the next Bourne film, taking the release date, with Renner returning as Cross in a separate film at a later date. On June 18, 2014, the studio pushed back the film from August 14, 2015, to July 15, 2016. The film Jason Bourne premiered in the United States on July 29, 2016 to mixed reviews.

See also
 List of films featuring surveillance

References

External links

 
 

2007 films
2000s English-language films
English-language German films
2007 action thriller films
2000s spy thriller films
American action thriller films
American sequel films
American spy thriller films
Babelsberg Studio films
BAFTA winners (films)
Bourne (film series)
Films about the Central Intelligence Agency
Films about computer hacking
Films about United States Army Special Forces
Films directed by Paul Greengrass
Films produced by Frank Marshall
Films scored by John Powell
Films set in 2004
Films set in 2005
Films set in London
Films set in Madrid
Films set in Morocco
Films set in Moscow
Films set in New York City
Films set in Paris
Films set in Turin
Films shot at Pinewood Studios
Films shot in Berlin
Films shot in London
Films shot in Madrid
Films shot in Morocco
Films shot in New Jersey
Films shot in New York City
Films that won the Best Sound Editing Academy Award
Films that won the Best Sound Mixing Academy Award
Films whose editor won the Best Film Editing Academy Award
Films with screenplays by Scott Z. Burns
Films with screenplays by Tony Gilroy
Films with screenplays by George Nolfi
German action thriller films
German sequel films
German spy thriller films
The Kennedy/Marshall Company films
Universal Pictures films
2000s American films
2000s German films